"Never There" is the first single released from American alternative rock band Cake's third studio album, Prolonging the Magic (1998). The song was commercially successful, topping the US Billboard Modern Rock Tracks chart and appearing on the music charts of four other countries. In Australia, the song appeared at number 30 on the Triple J Hottest 100 countdown for 1998.

Content
According to Cake vocalist John McCrea, the lyrics are sung from the viewpoint of a boy who is frustrated that his girlfriend never answers his phone calls. The boyfriend believes he will not make it through life without her, but in reality, he needs to focus on his own concerns instead. McCrea has described "Never There" as "a country song in disguise".

Chart performance
The song spent three weeks at number one on the US Billboard Modern Rock Tracks chart, surpassing "The Distance" (which peaked at number four) as the band's highest-charting single. "Never There" was the band's first song to chart on the Billboard Hot 100 at number 78. In Iceland, the song was a major hit, peaking at number nine in November 1998. The song also charted in Australia, Canada, and the United Kingdom, reaching numbers 75, 42, and 66, respectively.

Music video
The music video for "Never There", directed by McCrea, features Cake performing in a western-style bar, while a story arc covers a trucker calling his girlfriend on a pay phone and she never answers as she is too busy partying with male body builders in speedos. It was filmed in Sacramento, California.

Track listings

US and European CD single
 "Never There" (LP version) – 2:44
 "Cool Blue Reason" (LP version) – 3:27

UK 7-inch single
A. "Never There" – 2:44
B. "I Will Survive" – 5:11

UK CD1
 "Never There" (LP version)
 "Cool Blue Reason" (LP version)
 "Is This Love?" (live)
 "Never There" (video)

UK CD2
 "Never There" (LP version) – 2:44
 "The Distance" (LP version) – 3:01
 "You Part the Waters" (live) – 2:50
 "The Distance" (video) – 3:04

Australian CD single
 "Never There" (LP version) – 2:44
 "Cool Blue Reason" (LP version) – 3:27
 "Half as Much" – 2:54

Credits and personnel
Credits are lifted from the European CD single and Prolonging the Magic liner notes.

Studios
 Recorded at Pus Cavern, Paradise Studios (Sacramento, California), Hyde St. Studios, and Coast Recorders (San Francisco, California)
 Mastered at Precision Mastering (Los Angeles)

Cake
 John McCrea – writing, vocals, acoustic guitar, production
 Vincent Di Fiore – trumpet, background vocals
 Todd Roper – drums, background vocals
 Gabriel Nelson – bass guitar
 Xan McCurdy – electric guitar

Other personnel
 Kirt Shearer – mixing
 Craig Long – mixing
 Don C. Tyler – mastering

Charts

Weekly charts

Year-end charts

Certifications

Release history

References

1998 singles
1998 songs
Cake (band) songs
Capricorn Records singles
Mercury Records singles
Songs about loneliness
Songs about telephone calls
Songs written by John McCrea (musician)
Torch songs